A cross-counter is a counter-attack begun immediately after an opponent throws a jab, exploiting the opening in the opponent's position.

Punches (combat)
Boxing terminology
Kickboxing terminology